Support.com, Inc. was a technical support company for businesses and consumers. It was headquartered in Wilmington, Delaware with an administrative office in Sunnyvale, California. The company's services are performed on Windows, macOS, iOS, and Android, supporting connected and smart devices. These services are performed by the company's remote, full-time workforce based mainly in the U.S.

Support.com owns SUPERAntiSpyware, headquartered in Eugene, Oregon, which offers anti-malware software. The company also owns RightHand IT, headquartered in Louisville, Colorado, which provides managed IT services for small businesses.

History

Formation, IPO, and name changes
In September 1997, Mark Pincus, Scott Dale, and Cadir Lee launched Replicase Inc., a software company in Redwood City, California. SoftBank invested $2.5 million in the company. In October 1998, Replicase was renamed Tioga Systems, Inc., coinciding with the relocation of the corporate headquarters to Palo Alto, California. The company's focus moved to self-healing software, the idea that Windows applications could automatically fix any problems they encountered. In December 1999, the company changed its corporate name to Support.com, then headquartered in Redwood City. Its focus shifted to providing support software for enterprise companies.

The company went public with an IPO on July 19, 2000, backed by Credit Suisse First Boston.

On March 28, 2002, Support.com was renamed SupportSoft, Inc. On June 23, 2009, the enterprise technology of SupportSoft was acquired by Consona Corporation, and the company name was changed back to Support.com.

During the COVID-19 pandemic, Support.com announced a free month of tech support to support consumers working or learning from home. In March 2020, the company hired over 100 additional remote customer support agents to keep up with a higher demand for their services, bringing their total number of employees to 1,200, and stated that it planned on hiring an "unlimited number of remote support agent roles to support demand for virtual call centers and remote tech support."

Executive history
In August 1999, Radha Basu, coming from Hewlett-Packard, was appointed president and CEO, with Pincus moving to chairman. With the appointment, Basu became one of the few female Indian CEOs in the US. Pincus remained with the company until 2003, when he left to start Tribe Networks. In April 2006, Basu stepped down, and Josh Pickus was named CEO, coming from CA Technologies. He aimed to bring the business back to profitability by focusing on direct customer support, as opposed to primarily licensing software to large service providers. On April 1, 2014, Pickus resigned from his position as president and CEO. In May 2014, Elizabeth Cholawsky, formerly of Citrix Systems, was announced as Support.com's new CEO. In October 2016, Richard Bloom was appointed interim president and CEO, with the interim tag later being removed. On August 10, 2020, Support.com announced that Lance Rosenzweig would succeed Bloom as president and CEO.

Acquisition

Products and services
 TechSolutions - direct-to-consumer tech support for connected devices with help from live tech support agents via phone, chat, or virtual house calls; includes Support.com Guided Paths, free self-support tools
 Virtual call center services and remote IT Help desk support - outsourced technical support services including remote call center operations and software platform to enable remote call center teams 
 Nexus - cloud-based software for support interaction optimization
 Small business tech support services - RightHand IT and remote tech support for small business
 SUPERAntiSpyware - anti-malware software

In October 2013, Support.com announced the latest version of its Nexus Service Delivery Platform, which included expanded service for mobile devices and real-time analytics. In July 2014, Support.com released SUPERAntiSpyware 6.0, its anti-malware software. Its TechSolutions consumer tech support was announced in October 2019.

Acquisitions, customers, and partnerships 
Support.com acquired Core Networks in 2004; YourTechOnline in 2008; and Sammsoft in 2009. In 2011, the company acquired SUPERAntiSpyware. In 2012, the company acquired RightHand IT.

The company's customers have included Zendesk, Upclick, SiOnyx, Cox Communications and Comcast. The company has entered into partnerships with companies including InstallerNet, Office Depot, AOL, Staples, Sony, OnForce, and Absolute Software Corporation. The company also launched a partnership with Target to provide tech support for Target's MyTGTtech solution.

Litigations 

On February 27, 2012, a class action lawsuit was filed against Support.com and AOL, claiming that their Computer Checkup software would offer to perform a free scan, purposely find problems that did not actually exist and then offer to sell software to remedy those problems. Both AOL and Support.com settled the claim on May 30, 2013, by offering a refund to consumers up to a total amount of $8.5 million.

In December 2016, a complaint was filed against Support.com and Office Depot alleging their free PC Health Check Program used by Office Depot purposely misidentified malware symptoms, and that consumers were then encouraged to purchase repair services. In March 2019, Office Depot agreed to pay $25 million and Support.com agreed to pay $10 million to settle the complaint. Support.com suspended use of the PC Health Check Program in 2016.

Merger 
On September 15, 2021, Greenidge Generation Holdings, a Bitcoin mining company, acquired Support.com and delisted its stock from the Nasdaq.

References

External links
 

American companies established in 1997
Companies based in Sunnyvale, California
Help desk software
Companies formerly listed on the Nasdaq
Software companies based in California
Multinational companies
Software companies established in 1997
Software companies of the United States
2000 initial public offerings